Adrian Kenneth Reeves-Jones (born 18 October 1966) is an English former footballer who played for Port Vale, Leek Town, and Eastwood Town.

Career
Reeves-Jones graduated through Port Vale's youth team to sign as a professional in November 1984. He made his first appearance at Vale Park as a substitute in a goalless draw with Wrexham on 25 March 1985 and made his full debut on 17 April, in a 1–0 defeat by Northampton Town at the County Ground. Three days after making his full debut he played in a 2–0 defeat to Chester City at Sealand Road. However these were his only Fourth Division games for the "Valiants" in the 1984–85 season, and manager John Rudge gave him a free transfer to North West Counties League side Leek Town in May 1985. He played 18 games in the 1986–87 season, scoring one goal against Glossop North End on 12 August. He later played for Eastwood Town.

Career statistics
Source:

References

1966 births
Living people
Footballers from Stoke-on-Trent
English footballers
Association football midfielders
Port Vale F.C. players
Leek Town F.C. players
Eastwood Hanley F.C. players
English Football League players
North West Counties Football League players